The Shapira Scroll, also known as the Shapira Strips or Shapira Manuscript, was a set of leather strips inscribed in Paleo-Hebrew script. It was presented by Moses Wilhelm Shapira in 1883 as an ancient Bible-related artifact and almost immediately denounced by scholars as a forgery.

The scroll consisted of fifteen leather strips, which Shapira claimed had been found in Wadi Mujib (biblical Arnon) near the Dead Sea. The Hebrew text hinted at a different version of Deuteronomy, including the addition of a new line to the Ten Commandments: "You shall not hate your brother in your heart: I am God, your god." The text also lacks all laws except for the ten commandments, which it renders consistently in the first-person, from the standpoint of the deity. Scholars took little time to reject it as a fake, and the shame brought about by the accusation of forgery drove Shapira to suicide in 1884.

The scroll reappeared a couple of years later in a Sotheby's auction, where it was sold for £10 5s to Bernard Quaritch, who later listed it for £25. Contemporary reports show Dr. Philip Brookes Mason displayed the "whole of" the scroll at a public lecture in Burton-on-Trent on March 8, 1889. The current whereabouts of the scroll, if it survives, are unknown.

Discovery of the scroll
Shapira's account of the discovery of the scroll varied at times and the differences between them have been used as evidence of forgery. Paul Schröder, the first person Shapira showed the scroll to in person, recalled:Mr. Shapira did not wish to tell me the provenance of the manuscript. He only told me that it came from a tomb beyond the Jordan.
While in Germany, Shapira told Hermann Guthe that:At the end of July or the beginning of August a certain Selim of the tribe of Adachaje ... offered in the Shapira shop a blackish stripe of leather for sale. Shapira himself was not present and found the cheaply acquired leather in the store on his return. As Salim was unable to visit Jerusalem, he had asked his friend, the Sheik, Mahmud of Abu Dis near Jerusalem, to arrange a meeting with Salem which, finally, brought all the strips into Shapira's possession.Another is contained within a handwritten letter from Shapira to Professor Hermann Strack of Berlin on 9 May 1883:
In July 1878 I met several Bedouins in the house of the well-known Sheque Mahmud el Arakat, we came of course to speak of old inscriptions. One Bedouin . . . begins to tell a history to about [sic] the following effect. Several years ago some Arabs had occasion to flee from their enemies & hid themselves in caves high up in a rock facing the Moujib (the neues Arnon [sic]) they discovered there several bundles of very old rugs. Thinking they may [sic] contain gold they peeled away a good deal of Cotton or Linen & found only some black charms & threw them away; but one of them took them up & and [sic] since having the charms in his tent, he became a wealthy man having sheeps [sic] etc.Shapira wrote a letter to Ginsburg in early August, informing him that:In July 1878, the Sheik Machmud Arakat, the well-known chief of the guides from Jerusalem to the Jordan, paid me the customary visit . . . [as] the Sheik hat Bedouins of the East in his house, he brought them all with him . . . I heard the next day . . . some men of his acquaintance had hidden themselves, in the time when Wali of Damascus was fighting the Arabs, in caves hewn high up in a rock . . . near the Modjib. They found there several bundles of old black linen. I asked the Sheik to employ him as a messenger to bring me some of the pieces that I might examine them, but the Sheik thought that that man would not do it, but he knew a man who was not superstitious at all . . . In about twelve days I got four or five columns . . . in eight days more he brought me about sixteen; in eleven or twelve days more four or five . . . I have not seen the man again. The Sheik died soon, and I lost every trace that would enable me to follow the object further.In an account to the Palestine Exploration Fund on July 20, 1883, Shapira said that:[H]e first heard of the fragments in the middle of July 1878. A Sheikh, with several Arabs of different tribes came to him at his place of business in Jerusalem on other matters. The Sheikh had nothing to do with antiquities. They spoke of some little black fragments of writing in the possession of an Arab. They had been found in the neighborhood of Arnon. One of the Arabs spoke of them as talismans, smelling of asphalte. The day following Shapira was invited to dinner by the Sheikh, and heard more about the fragments. About the year 1865, at a time of persecution, certain Arabs had hid themselves among the rocks. There, on the side of a rocky cavern, they found several bundles wrapped in linen. Peeling off the covering they found only black fragments, which they thew away. They were picked up by one of the Arabs, believing them to be talismans . . . Shapira promised the Sheikh a reward if he would bring to him an Arab he spoke of who would be able to get hold of the fragments. This happened on the day of the dinner. The Sheikh fell ill, and afterwards died. About ten or twelve days after the dinner, a man of the Ajayah tribe brought to him a small piece . . . a week later, he brought fourteen or fifteen columns . . . the next Sunday, fourteen or fifteen more . . . ten days after, on Wednesday, he brought three or four columns, very black. Shapira saw nothing more of him.Claude Reigner Conder received yet another version from Shapira, which attributed the scroll and the Moabite forgeries to the same location and claimed a mummy had been found with the scroll.

Presentation of the scroll

In Germany
On 24 September 1878, Shapira sent copies to Konstantin Schlottmann, who had wrongly authenticated Shapira's Moabite forgeries in 1870. Schlottmann consulted with Franz Delitzsch and then denounced the scroll as a fabrication. Delitzch published separately in his journal Saat auf Hoffnung in 1880, calling it a fake.

On 9 May 1883, Shapira wrote a ten-page letter to Hermann Strack, saying he'd trust Strack's judgement over his own with regard to the scroll's authenticity. Strack replied on 27 May, declaring "that it was not worth [Shapira]'s while to bring such an evident forgery to Europe." Also in May 1883, Shapira showed one piece of the manuscript to Paul Schröder, then the German consul in Beirut, for a short time in poor light; he refused to authenticate it without longer study of all the fragments.

In June 1883, perhaps having revised the text, Shapira brought the scroll to Germany in an attempt to sell it to the Royal Library of Berlin. Karl Richard Lepsius, then the Library's keeper, convened a symposium of leading Bible scholars in Berlin (Lepsius himself, Eduard Sachau, Eberhard Schrader, August Dillmann, Adolf Erman, and Moritz Steinschneider), to evaluate the scroll on July 10; these unanimously declared it a fake after a 90-minute inspection. In a separate German analysis in the first week of July, published August 14, Hermann Guthe and Eduard Meyer concluded the scroll was a forgery; Theodor Nöldeke and Emil Friedrich Kautzsch were said to agree. Shapira also showed the scroll to Strack in person, whose view did not change. The Royal Library offered to buy it at a lower price, to enable German students to study the forger's technique; Shapira took it to London instead. The German scholars did not publicize their findings, and other experts' conclusions were reached independently.

In London
On July 20, Shapira informed the secretary of the Palestine Exploration Fund that he had brought the manuscript to London, and on July 24 he showed the manuscript to the Fund's Walter Besant and Claude Reignier Conder. On July 26, he displayed the manuscript to a large number of British scholars at the Fund's offices, even tearing off a portion to demonstrate the parchment's interior; the manuscript was then taken to the British Museum for further inspection.

Shapira sought to sell the scroll to the British Museum for a million pounds, and allowed the Museum to exhibit two of the 15 strips. The Museum designated Christian David Ginsburg to evaluate the strips, and he published transcriptions, translations, and facsimiles over the following weeks. On August 4, 1883, Walter Flight of the British Museum reported that much of the leather looked ancient but the margin of one piece looked brand new; on August 17, Edward Augustus Bond, principal librarian of the British Museum, indicated that he too thought they were fake.

On August 13, Adolf Neubauer, who had earlier exposed Shapira's fake "coffin of Samson", identified the scroll as a forgery; on August 19, he published further arguments against its authenticity, as did Archibald Sayce on the same day. Neubauer's identification was later called the scroll's death knell.

The French Ministry of Public Instruction's Charles Simon Clermont-Ganneau, who had earlier revealed Shapira's Moabite forgeries, arrived in England on the 15th, already harboring "most serious doubts." He obtained a quick look at some fragments from Ginsburg, but was quickly banned by Shapira from further studying the scroll. However, Clermont-Ganneau closely examined the two strips on display at the public exhibition on August 18 and, on August 21, he declared them to be forgeries. Claude Reignier Conder also declared them fake on the 21st, and Ernest Renan, Albert Löwy, and Charles Henry Waller soon followed. By August 25, the Grantham Journal reported, "The official verdict on the authenticity of Mr. Shapira's manuscripts has not been given but the published evidence of experts who have examined them is unanimous against it."

On August 27, Christian David Ginsburg, who as the designated philological examiner of the British Museum had been given access to the entire scroll, published the same conclusion. Earlier that week, the British Museum had ceased to display Shapira's strips. Ginsburg also suggested the shape of the strips, their ruling, and the leather used matched Yemenite scrolls Shapira had sold in previous years. Clermont-Ganneau later made the same assessment. Schlottmann, Delitzch, Strack, and Steinschneider, amazed at the ongoing situation in England, each published their July findings for the British audience in September. Ginsburg and Clermont-Ganneau published their final reports that same month.

Aftermath and scroll's fate

Ginsburg's conclusion drove Shapira to despair, and he fled London.

In spite of writing to Ginsburg that he would leave for Berlin, he fled London to Amsterdam instead, leaving the manuscript behind, and from Amsterdam he wrote a letter to Edward Augustus Bond, principal librarian of the British Museum, begging for reconsideration of the manuscript. In both letters, Shapira reaffirmed his belief in the scroll's authenticity. Six months later, on 9 March 1884, he shot himself at the Hotel Willemsbrug in Rotterdam.

Shapira's widow, Anna Magdalena Rosette, had at least part of the scroll in 1884, as evidenced by a note in the Ginsburg file left by Bond. Rosette sent "two small pieces" to Schlottmann for further study in 1884. It later appeared in an auction at Sotheby's in 1885 and it was purchased by Bernard Quaritch, a bookseller, for £10 5s. Two years later, Quaritch listed the scroll for sale for £25 and displayed it at the Anglo-Jewish Historical Exhibition in 1887.

In 1970 Professor Alan David Crown, on the basis of a misreading of a letter from Sir Charles Nicholson to Walter Scott wherein Nicholson claimed that "most" of the Shapira manuscripts had fallen into his hands, advanced the hypothesis that Nicholson had acquired the Shapira Scroll itself, with the scroll destroyed in a fire in Nicholson's London study in 1899, along with most of his collection. Apart from Nicholson's hyperbole - he is only known to have acquired six Torah scrolls compared to the 167 manuscripts acquired in 1884 by Adolph Sutro - Nicholson never wrote that he acquired the Shapira scroll itself. Crown's hypothesis was widely accepted as the best explanation of the scroll's fate.

In 2011 Australian researcher Matthew Hamilton identified the actual owner of the scroll, the English doctor and natural historian, Dr. Philip Brookes Mason. Contemporary reports show Dr. Philip Brookes Mason displayed the "whole of" the scroll at a public lecture in Burton-on-Trent on March 8, 1889. Further whereabouts of the scroll, if it survived, are unknown.

Features of the scroll

Physical appearance
Shapira's scroll was composed of fifteen leather strips, some easy to read and others blackened to the point of near-illegibility. Each complete strip was extremely narrow, about 3.5 inches by 7 inches. Each complete strip had an average of ten lines of writing on one side only. They were folded, not rolled. Each complete strip was folded between one and three times, for a total of 40 folds. They were covered in dark glutinous matter and had a faint odor of funeral spices or asphalt, known in the nineteenth century for their use in Egyptian mummification but not later found on genuine dead sea scrolls. Some of the strips were covered in oil, artificially darkening the parchment, on top of which some had a layer of grey ash, which Shapira said had been applied to absorb the oil. Each segment had one rough edge and one smooth edge, consistent with a top or bottom margin recently cut off an older manuscript. Each segment had vertical creases marked with a hard point as a scribe would mark for columns, but the text of the Shapira scroll has no relation to these lines, weaving in and out of them randomly, suggesting that a forger had taken the blank margin of a marked Torah scroll and written his text ignoring the faint column lines. Ginsburg and Clermont-Ganneau suggested that the material was identical to the leather of the medieval Yemenite Torah scrolls in which Shapira had dealt in the preceding years. The outline of a frame could be seen, perhaps used to administer aging chemicals, and the straight edge of one segment looked new.

Script
The scroll is written scriptio continua except in the Decalogue, a style never discovered in other Hebrew manuscripts but widely assumed by Shapira's contemporaries to have been the original form of the text. In the Decalogue, every word is followed by an interpunct except לא, do not, and nota accusativi. The writing, by multiple hands, more closely resembles that of inscriptions like the Mesha Stele, already published by 1878, than it does the Paleo-Hebrew writing later found on parchment, or even the Siloam inscription, which would be published in 1880; even in the nineteenth century the similarity was thought suspect. André Lemaire authored a recent paleographic analysis (1997):However, the letter shapes do not correspond exactly to any known ancient West Semitic script. It is neither Moabite (although most letters seem like imitations of Moabite writing in the Mesha Stele, which records the ninth-century B.C.E. Moabite king Mesha's victories over Israel....) nor "Canaanite" (West Semitic writing from about the 13th to the 11th century B.C.E.). It is neither the Hebrew script used during the First Temple period nor the archaizing paleo-Hebrew script found on coins of the First Jewish Revolt against Rome (66–70 C.E.) and the Second Jewish Revolt (132–135 C.E.) and in several of the Dead Sea Scrolls. In truth, after a simple look at the facsimile, an experienced paleographer can see it is a forgery.Ginsburg reported that some strips were duplicates in different hands, with very slight differences (noted infra).

Spelling and wording
The text uses Moabite spellings, made famous by the Mesha Stele in 1870 but never attested in any Israelite text or on parchment; some aberrant plene spellings, as of יום and סיחן, further suggested forgery. The text omits some consonantal yods as well, suggesting an erroneous attempt to replicate Moabite spellings. The scroll contains several apparent misspellings, ungrammatical phrases, and words from later Hebrew, which featured prominently in the negative assessments of its authenticity. The scroll often replaces Deuteronomic words with close synonyms, including ירא > פחד, שכב > בעל, קצפ > אנפ, לפנים > מעלם, and more; these synonyms are not always exact, resulting in incongruent grammar, and sometimes rely on later meanings unattested in Biblical Hebrew.

Modern scholarship
Despite the unanimous assessment of the 19th century scholars who had access to the manuscripts that they were a forgery, a few have argued the scroll was genuine since it was lost.

Menahem Mansoor argued in 1956 that re-examination of the case would be justified. Mansoor's conclusion was immediately attacked by Moshe H. Goshen-Gottstein and by Oskar K. Rabinowicz. J. L. Teicher and others argued the scroll could be genuine.
More recently, Shlomo Guil (2017),  (2021), Ross Nichols (2021), and others
have argued that the strips were genuine. However, these claims have been repeatedly contested by other scholars and it remains a minority view.

Text of the scroll

Gallery

Notes

References

Bibliography

Further reading

Original scholarly papers
 , including the assessments by A. Neubauer, Clermont-Ganneau, C. R. Conder, and C. D. Ginsburg.
 Asya, Yaakov (1975). "Parashat Shapira", supplement to: Myriam Harry [pseud.], "Bat Yerushalayim Hakatanah" (in Hebrew, A. Levenson Publishing House), originally published as "La Petite Fille de Jerusalem" (in French, Paris, 1914)
 Besant, Walter. "Autobiography of Sir Walter Besant" (New York, 1902; reprint, St. Clair Shores, MI: Scholarly Press, 1971), pp. 161–167
 Carter, A.C.R. "Shapira, the Bible Forger", in "Let Me Tell You", pp. 216–219, London, 1940
 Clermont-Ganneau, C. S. "Les fraudes archéologiques en Palestine", Paris, 1885, pp. 107ff., 152ff. 159, 173 
 Guthe, Hermann. "Fragmente einer Lederhandschrift", Leipzig, 1883

Initial reappraisal (1956–1958)
 Goshen-Gottstein, Moshe H. "The Shapira Forgery and the Qumran Scrolls", Journal of Jewish Studies 7 [1956], 187–193, and "The Qumran Scrolls and the Shapira Forgery" [in Hebrew], Haaretz, 28 December 1956
  
 
 Teicher, J.L. "The Genuineness of the Shapira Manuscripts", Times Literary Supplement, 22 March 1957

Modern scholarship (1965–)
 
 
 Budde, Hendrik (1994). Die Affaere um die 'Moabitischen Althertuemer''' [The 'Moabitic Antiquities' Affair], in Budde and Mordechay Lewy, Von Halle Nach Jerusalem [From Halle to Jerusalem], pp. 106–117, in German. Ministerium für Wissenschaft und Forschung des Landes Sachsen-Anhalt [Science Ministry of the State of Saxony-Anhalt], Halle.
 
 
Dershowitz, Idan (2021). The Valediction of Moses: A Proto-Biblical Book. Forschungen zum Alten Testament.
 Dershowitz, Idan (2021). "The Valediction of Moses: New Evidence on the Shapira Deuteronomy Fragments." Zeitschrift für die alttestamentliche Wissenschaft 133 (1): 1-22.
 Guil, Shlomo (2012). In Search of the Shop of Moses Wilhelm Shapira, the Leading Figure of the 19th Century Archaeological Enigma
 
 Mansoor (1983). The Dead Sea Scrolls: A Textbook and Study Guide, 2nd ed., chap. 25, pp. 215–224. Baker Book House, Grand Rapids, MI.
 Nichols, Ross K. (2021). The Moses Scroll: Reopening the Most Controversial Case in the History of Biblical Scholarship, Horeb Press, St. Francisville, LA. .
 
 
 
 
 
 Silberman, Neil Asher (1982), One Million Pounds Sterling, the Rise and Fall of Moses Wilhelm Shapira, 1883–1885, in "Digging for God and Country" New York: Knopf
 
 
 Sabo, Yoram (2014). Shapira & I. A documentary film. In the footsteps of Shapira and his scroll. Sabo, Yoram (2018). The Scroll Merchant: In Search Of Moses Wilhelm Shapira's Lost Jewish Treasure'' (Hebrew). Hakibbutz Hameuchad.

Primary sources
 British Library Add. MS. 41294, "Papers Relative to M. W. Shapira's Forged MS. of Deuteronomy (A.D. 1883–1884)."
 Some letters and images were published in 

Archaeological forgeries
19th-century hoaxes